The rivière à la Loutre is a tributary of the Ashuapmushuan River, flowing in the unorganized territory of Rivière-Mistassini and in the municipality of Saint-Thomas-Didyme, in the Maria-Chapdelaine Regional County Municipality, in the administrative region of Saguenay–Lac-Saint-Jean, in the province of Quebec, in Canada.

The valley of the Rivière à la Loutre is mainly served by forest roads including the R-0202 in the upper part.

Forestry is the main economic activity in this valley.

Geography 
This lake is fed by the discharge of a stream (coming from the northwest) and by the discharge (coming from the south) of a group of lakes including Lake Raymond and Lake Carré.

The mouth of Lac à la Truite is located in a forest zone in the Rivière-Mistassini territory, at:
  west of Lac à Jim;
  north-west of the center of the village of Saint-Thomas-Didyme;
  north of the mouth of Rivière à la Loutre;
  northwest of downtown Saint-Félicien.

  first east for about 240 meters to a bend in the river corresponding to the discharge (coming from the north) of Lac du Trois Milles; then south, forming a few streamers, then crossing the fourchu lake (length:  shaped like a hockey stick with the handle facing south;), up to its mouth. Note: Lake Fourchu receives the discharge from Lac à la Loutre on the northwest side;
  towards the south in a deep valley crossing at the end of the segment a lake (length:  in the shape of a donut with an island in the center;), up to its mouth;
  towards the south-east, collecting the discharge (coming from the north) of a stream and entering the Ashuapmushuan Wildlife Reserve, up to its mouth.

The confluence of the Rivière à la Loutre is located at:

  to the southwest of the center of the village of Saint-Thomas-Didyme;
  north-west of downtown Saint-Félicien.

Toponymy 
The toponym "rivière à la Loutre" was made official on December 5, 1968, at the Place Names Bank of the Commission de toponymie du Québec.

See also 
 List of rivers of Quebec

Notes and references

External links 
 

Rivers of Saguenay–Lac-Saint-Jean
Maria-Chapdelaine Regional County Municipality